Ben Turbett (1874 – March 6, 1936) was an opera performer, actor, and film director in the United States.

He was born in Salem, Massachusetts and performed in operas as a young man. In 1909 he appeared in the Broadway production Stubborn Cinderella.

Filmography

Actor
 The Blue Coyote Cherry Crop d'Ashley Miller (1914)
 The Working of a Miracle d'Ashley Miller (1915)
 The Corporal's Daughter de Will Louis (1915)
 The Broken Word de Frank McGlynn Sr. (1915)

Director
 The Voice of the Violin (1915 film) (1915)
 When Love Is King (1916)
 Love Is King (1916)
 The Last Sentence (1917)
 The Royal Pauper (1917)
 Builders of Castles (1917)
 The Half Back (1917)
 Gallegher (1917)
 The Lady of the Photograph (1917)
 Cy Whittaker's Ward (1917)
 The Courage of the Common Place (1917)
 The Lady of the Photograph (1917) 
 The Courage of the Common Place (1917)

References

Male actors from Massachusetts
Film directors from Massachusetts
20th-century American male opera singers
20th-century American male actors
American male stage actors
American male silent film actors
1874 births
1936 deaths
People from Salem, Massachusetts